Wendy Sharpe FRSN (born 24 February 1960 in Sydney) is an Australian artist who lives and works in Sydney and Paris. She has held over 70 solo exhibitions nationally and internationally, been awarded several national awards and artist residencies for her work, and was an official Australian War Artist to East Timor in 1999–2000.

Personal life 
Wendy Sharpe was born in 1960 in Sydney, Australia. She is the only child of British parents; her father is the writer and historian Alan Sharpe.

She spent her early years in the Northern Beaches in Sydney, and from 1978 and 1979 she studied at Seaforth Technical College. She received a Graduate Diploma of Professional Art from the City Art Institute in Sydney in 1984, and a Master's degree from the College of Fine Arts, University of New South Wales in 1995.

She taught part-time at art schools for many years; including a position at the National Art School, Sydney.

Sharpe works in a large warehouse studio in inner Sydney, and in an apartment/artist studio in Montmartre, Paris, which she owns with her partner, artist Bernard Ollis.

Work 

Sharpe works in oil paint creating large scale portrait and figurative works that depict real people as well as imagined elements. She also creates commissioned murals.

Chris Saines, Director of Queensland Art Gallery of Modern Art said Sharpe’s work explores a “...constant curiosity about the world, the outer limits of the human imagination, and the part played by art history in nourishing them both. She is, first and foremost, an extraordinarily accomplished painter who makes it all look so easy, when it never is.”

Portraits

She has painted portraits of many well-known figures in the Australian arts industry, including Ash Flanders (finalist in the Archibald Prize, 2014), Venus Vamp (finalist in the Archibald prize, 2013), Magda Szubanski (finalist in the Archibald prize, 2020), Elena Kats – Chernin (now in the permanent collection of the National Portrait Gallery, Canberra, 2017).

Murals 

Wendy Sharpe has created a number of temporary murals and major wall paintings in museums and galleries, such as; Maitland Regional Gallery, Mosman Art Gallery, Lake Macquarie Museum of Art and Culture and The Yellow House, Potts Point.

In 2021, she painted a forty metre ephemeral mural, ‘Vu iz dos gesele?/Where is the little street?’, at Sydney Jewish Museum. The mural depicted her recent family research trip to Ukraine. It included a portrait of her grandmother and poetic imagery about time passing. Government imposed COVID-19 restrictions at the time meant that the mural was never to open to the public. A documentary on the mural ‘Site Unseen’ was later shown on ABC TV’s Compass program.
[[File:WS Cook & Philip Aquatic Centre Mural long.tif|thumb|396x396px|The Annette Kellermann Mural' by Wendy Sharpe at Cook and Philip Park Aquatic and Fitness Centre, Sydney]]
City of Sydney council commissioned Sharpe in 1998 to paint an Olympic pool sized mural on the life of Australian swimmer, actress and vaudeville performer, Annette Kellerman. It is a series of eight paintings hung suspended along one side of the pool, permanently displayed in the Cook + Phillip Aquatic Centre, Sydney.

In 2020, Sharpe was commissioned by the Inner West Council’s Perfect Match program, for their 100th mural. Titled ‘Women’s Empowerment Mural’, it is on the corner of Church and Federation Street, Newtown, painted on the wall surrounding the home of Ewan Samway and his partner Matt Vagulans.

 Performance 
Sharpe has created works through residencies with Sydney Dance Company and Opera Australia and drawn burlesque performers and drag queens from the audience view and backstage. She has also drawn live on stage at various art spaces

Sharpe was commissioned by Arts Centre Melbourne in 2008-2009 to make a series of drawings to commemorate Stravinsky’s ‘Firebird and Petruska’, with choreographer Graeme Murphy.

 Official War Artist 
In 1999, Sharpe was appointed official war artist during the Australian military role in East Timor, commissioned by the Australian War Memorial, Canberra. She was the first female artist to be appointed in this role since World War II.

As on the Australian War Memorial website:

“Sharpe commenced duty in Darwin, where she attended briefing sessions and recorded the everyday activities of life in the barracks. On 12 December, she departed for East Timor on HMAS 'Jervis Bay'. Attached to the Army History Unit, she was assigned a military escort and wore a non-combatant uniform with the insignia "Australian Official Artist". Sharpe spent three weeks sketching the local people and Australian peacekeepers, before returning to Sydney to complete major works based on her observations.” 

After returning from East Timor, Sharpe's paintings and drawings made on duty were added to the AWM's collection.

 Exhibitions 
Sharpe has exhibited work regularly since the mid 1980s throughout Australia; in commercial galleries, state museums, regional galleries and art spaces. She has also had solo exhibitions in the UK, France, China, Germany. In total she has had over 70 solo exhibitions nationally and internationally,

A major retrospective of her work, ’The Imagined Life’ was held at S. H. Ervin Gallery, The National Trust, Sydney, in 2011.

 International Residencies and Scholarships 
Though based in Sydney, Sharpe spends part of every year in an artist studio/apartment in Paris. Sharpe has travelled extensively, and has been a recipient of many international artist residencies.

She was awarded the Marten Bequest Travelling Scholarship in 1986, and a residency at the Cité Internationale des Arts in Paris in 1987 (and again in 2007). These residencies were awarded through the Art Gallery of NSW.

In 2008, Sharpe was artist in residence at the Australian Embassy residence in Cairo, Egypt. She was an official guest of the Australian Ambassador, Robert Bowker.

Wendy Sharpe has made two trips to Antarctica as an artist in residence. First in 2012, aboard the scientific vessel, the Aurora Australis, for six weeks. The ship travelled from Hobart to Cape Denison, Antarctica. She produced work to commemorate the centenary voyage of Australian explorer Douglas Mawson, in association with the Australian Antarctic Division. The work produced on board the ship was later shown in a major exhibition at the Australian National Maritime Museum, Sydney; all money raised was donated to Mawson’s Hut Foundation.

Her second residency to Antarctica travelled from Argentina in 2014, with Chimu Adventures. The work produced was shown in ‘Paintings for Antarctica’, an exhibition at the Australian National Maritime Museum. In 2019, Sharpe and Ollis joined Chimu Adventures together aboard the Ocean Atlantic, on a trip to Svalbard in the arctic.

In 2014, Sharpe had a residency at Obracadobra, in Oaxaca, Mexico.

Sharpe has made several professional trips to China. In 2015, she was artist in residence at Funxing-Ginger Art Space, Zhouzhuang, Jiangsu. The work she made included a series about the Kunqu Opera.

Returning to China in 2016, she had exhibitions at: Linyi Contemporary Art Centre China, Qinghua Centre, 6th Shandong Cultural Industries Fair Jinan, ‘China Stories’ Shanghai Cultural Centre and Art Gallery Shanghai China.

Her residencies in Sydney include Taronga Zoo (2011), and at State Library of NSW (2017-2018), during renovations and major building work. The library acquired a collection of Sharpe’s folding book works.

 Involvement in Philanthropic Organisations & Fundraising 
Sharpe has worked with a number of different philanthropic organizations; creating work for fundraising exhibitions and events.

Through the Asylum Seeker Centre, Sydney; Sharpe drew 39 portraits of refugees and asylum seekers for her exhibition ‘Seeking Humanity – Portraits of Asylum Seekers’. These portraits were all drawn from life in pastel, and 100% of sales were donated to the centre. The exhibition toured from 2014 - 2015 from The Muse Gallery - Ultimo TAFE (Sydney), Belconnen Arts Centre (Canberra), Penrith Regional Gallery (Sydney) and Mary McKillop Place Museum (North Sydney). An ABC TV documentary was made about the exhibition (see Television). In 2015 she became patron of the Asylum Seeker Centre, Sydney.

In 2019, she travelled to Ethiopia with Catherine Hamlin Fistula Foundation. She drew patients, students and staff of the Addis Adaba Fistula Hospital, Desta Mender Rehabilitation and Reintegration Centre, and regional clinics. The completed drawings were exhibited at Macquarie Space Gallery in Sydney, March 2020, with all proceeds going to the foundation.

To assist Lou’s Place Daytime Women’s Refuge, Sydney; Sharpe created a fundraising exhibition titled Her Shoes. This was shown at Juniper Hall in Paddington, with assistance from Kim Chandler-MacDonald. There were 52 pastel drawings of shoes to represent how domestic violence can affect women of all ages and backgrounds.

 Television and Media 
Sharpe has appeared in numerous in Australian television programs, radio interviews and podcasts.

 Sitting for Wendy, Compass, ABC TV 
In 2015, Sharpe drew 39 portraits of asylum seekers who shared their stories of survival and integration. Filmed for the ABC TV documentary, Compass, the program followed the lives of three asylum seekers. The documentary includes footage of Sharpe as she drew each portrait, completed in a 2-3 hour sitting.

Sharpe's subjects talked to her about themselves, their homes, careers, where they came from and the families they've left behind.

 Life Drawing Live, SBS Television Life Drawing Live (2020), was Australia’s first live-televised life drawing class. Wendy Sharpe and Maryanne Coutts guided a group of Australian celebrities through a series of drawing exercises, using nude models. The show was hosted by Rove McManus.  

 Space 22, ABC TV, BBC Space 22 was a six-part documentary series exploring the impact of art and creativity on mental health, hosted by Natalie Bassingthwaighte. Wendy Sharpe was an art expert in episodes 3 and 4. Space 22 follows seven participants, each with their own lived experience of mental ill-health and trauma. They were directed through a series of creative exercises by Sharpe and other hosts, each exercise designed to use art as a tool to improve their mental wellbeing.

 Site Unseen, Compass, ABC TV 
Sharpe’s mural, ‘Vu iz dos gesele?/Where is the little street?’, was the subject of an ABC TV documentary, Site Unseen, at Sydney Jewish Museum in 2021.

The half hour documentary follows the mural’s development during COVID 19 lockdowns; from beginning sketches to the final work. The subject of the mural was based on imagery from a recent trip to Ukraine with her cousin, Ruth Fishman, to research their family history. Sharpe’s paternal family originally came from Kamianets-Podilskyi, but fled the pogroms to east London around 1900.

Made by Joshua Marks, Judy Menczel and Karly Marks, it aired on ABC TV on April 24, 2022.

Sharpe has also appeared in a number of documentaries, including:

 An interview with Jane Hutcheon, One Plus One, on ABC TV in 2016
 Numerous documentaries about the Archibald Prize; ‘The Archibald’, a 7-part documentary by Foxtel Media made in 2017, and ‘Finding the Archibald’, a 3-part ABC TV series that aired May 2021.
Wendy Sharpe has been a guest on many radio interviews and podcasts about her work. Such examples include: ‘Talking with Painters’ with Maria Stoljar (podcast) in 2020, ‘Conversations, with Sarah Kanowski in 2022, and  ‘TEDTalk: Asylum Seeker Portrait Project’, at the University of NSW, 22 September 2018.

Honours and Committees 
Sharpe was appointed as a member of the Council of the Australian War Memorial from May 25th, 2005 (for a three-year appointment), and was reappointed twice until her retirement in June 30th, 2013.

Between 2012 – 2013, Sharpe was on the ANZAC Centenary Advisory Arts Committee with the Australian Government.

In 2018, Sharpe was elected as a Fellow of the Royal Society of New South Wales. She was also awarded Fellowship of the National Art School, Sydney. She is currently a member of the Board of Directors of the National Art School, appointed in 2022.

Publications 
2022     Alchemy: Art and Poetry, in collaboration with Kate Forsyth, Published by Upswell Publishing

2021    Borderless: A transnational anthology of feminist poetry, Cover Edited Saba Vasefi, Melinda Smith and Yvette Holt, Published by Recent Work Press

2020     Book Cover & 20 Drawings for ‘Postcards from Tomorrow’, edited and published by Kim Chandler McDonald

2012     Jensen, David. ‘Wendy Sharpe’s Antarctica’, Published by Mawson's Huts Foundation

2005     Bevan, Scott. 'Battle Lines: Australian Artists at War', Published by Random House Australia

1992     Dysart, Dinah. Paroissien, Leon. ‘Eroticism – Images of Sexuality in Australian Art’, Published by Craftsman House

Collections 
Sharpe’s work is held in major collections throughout Australia in state galleries, regional galleries, and other institutions, such as:

 Art Gallery of New South Wales, Sydney
 Arts Centre Melbourne
 Adelaide Perry Collection, Croydon, NSW
 Australian National Maritime Museum, NSW
 Australian War Memorial, Canberra, ACT
 ANZAC Memorial, Sydney, NSW
 National Portrait Gallery, ACT
 Rockhampton Museum of Art, QLD
 State Library of NSW
 State Library of Queensland
 Sydney Jewish Museum, NSW

Awards and Prizes 
Sharpe has won an extensive list of awards, including: 

Winning the Sulman Prize in 1986 with Black Sun – Morning and Night, awarded by Albert Tucker, the Archibald Prize in 1996 with Self Portrait – as Diana of Erskineville, Portia Geach Memorial Award twice in 1995 with Self Portrait with Students – After Adélaïde Labille-Guiard and 2003 with Self Portrait with Teacup and Burning Paintings, the Adelaide Perry Drawing Prize in 2014 with Self Portrait with Imaginary Friend. She has been a finalist eight times in the Archibald Prize, the Sulman Prize twelve times (more than any other artist).

In 2022, she won the Gold Award at Rockhampton Museum of Art, QLD, judged by Chris Saines.

References 

1960 births
Living people
Artists from Sydney
Australian women painters
20th-century war artists
Archibald Prize winners
National Art School alumni
Australian war artists
20th-century Australian women artists
20th-century Australian artists
21st-century Australian women artists
21st-century Australian artists
Fellows of the Royal Society of New South Wales
Archibald Prize finalists